Our Lady of Fatima University (OLFU) is a private, nonsectarian, coeducational basic and higher education institution. It has six campuses located in:
Valenzuela City, Metro Manila
Our Lady of Fatima University – Valenzuela
Fatima University Medical Center – Valenzuela
College of Medicine
Quezon City, Metro Manila
Our Lady of Fatima University –  QC
Antipolo City, Rizal
Our Lady of Fatima University –  Antipolo
Fatima University Medical Center – Antipolo
San Fernando City, Pampanga
Our Lady of Fatima University –  Pampanga
Cabanatuan City, Nueva Ecija
Our Lady of Fatima University –  Nueva Ecija
 Santa Rosa City, Laguna
Our Lady of Fatima University –  Laguna

History
In 1967, Jose C. Olivares, with his son-in-law, Dr. Vicente M. Santos Sr., founded the Our Lady of Fatima Hospital in Valenzuela City. In 1973 he expanded the hospital to include a nursing college.

In 1979 the Fatima College of Medicine was established, with its pioneer batch graduating in 1983. In the 1990s the college diversified, starting programs in computer science, maritime education, education, psychology, biology, tourism and business.

The college became a university in December 2002, with Dr. Vicente M. Santos Sr. as its founding president.

The next years further saw an increase in infrastructure development. New buildings were established in the Valenzuela and Quezon City campuses, with additional nursing virtual laboratories and simulators. Fatima's College of Nursing was designated by the Commission on Higher Education (CHED) as a Center of Development in 2008. Fatima's expansion continued with the establishment of additional campuses in Antipolo, Pampanga, Nueva Ecija, and Sta. Rosa, Laguna.

The university submitted itself to the CHED's Institutional Quality Assurance through Monitoring and Evaluation (IQuAME) in 2008. In 2009 it was placed in Category A(t) as a mature teaching university.

The CHED granted autonomous status to the university for five years from March 11, 2009 to March 30, 2014.

Accreditation
The Fatima College of Physical Therapy, Fatima College of Pharmacy, Fatima College of Hotel and Restaurant Management, Fatima College of Nursing and Fatima College of Dental Medicine programs are accredited by the Philippine Association of and Universities Commission on Accreditation (PACUCOA).

Fatima University Medical Center and Virtual Laboratories
Near the College of Medicine is the Fatima University Medical Center, a 150-bed hospital on the university campus. The center is an institutional partner that serves as a teaching tertiary hospital.

Athletics
The 'Fatima Phoenix' commonly called Team Fatima are chosen athletes who compete in basketball, volleyball, badminton, taekwondo, cheerdancing, track and field, chess, billiards, and swimming. Their students represent the university in NAASCU, PRISAA and other competitions.

References

External links 
 Official website

Medical schools in the Philippines
Nursing schools in the Philippines
Dental schools in the Philippines
For-profit universities and colleges
Universities and colleges in Metro Manila
Universities and colleges in Rizal
Education in Valenzuela, Metro Manila
Universities and colleges in Quezon City
Education in Antipolo
Educational institutions established in 1973
1973 establishments in the Philippines
Educational institutions established in 1979
1979 establishments in the Philippines